RRDS may refer to:
 Relative Record Data Set
 Rough Rock Demonstration School, now Rough Rock Community School